Four ships of the Royal Navy have borne the name HMS Castor. Named  after one of the Gemini twins in Greek mythology. Castor also means "he who excels".

  was a 36-gun fifth rate that  captured from the Dutch in 1781. One month later the French Frippone captured Castor off Cadiz.
  was a 32-gun fifth rate launched in 1785.  She was briefly in French hands in 1794, but was recaptured. She was sold in 1819.
  was a 36-gun fifth rate launched in 1832. In 1860 she became a training ship, and was sold for breaking up in 1902.
  was a  light cruiser launched in 1915. She was sold in 1936.

References
 

Royal Navy ship names